San Andrés is a village located on the island of Tenerife in the Canary Islands (Spain). It is administratively part of the municipality of Santa Cruz de Tenerife. San Andrés is one of the oldest villages of Canary Islands, and was founded around 1498.

Local names 
San Andrés (English translation 'Saint Andrew') has had numerous names throughout its history. The Guanches called the two valleys that make up San Andrés "Abicor" and "Ibaute", being current and valleys of Cercado de Las Huertas respectively. According to some scholars "Abicor" was associated with fig trees, while others are similar to African voices to refer to the hives. Already after the arrival of the Spaniards, the valley became known in the early years of the Higueras Valley (by the abundance of them), Valle de Las Higueras and Los Sauces, Valle de Salazar (by the owners dated to the area) and Valle de San Andrés (being the saint's devotees Salazar) interchangeably. Finally prevail the current name of San Andrés. However, during the first half of the twentieth century was also known as "San Andres de Pots" by the major pottery production.

History 
The area has been populated since the Guanches (former inhabitants of the island of Tenerife), in fact, according to contemporary sources to the conquest of the Canary Islands, one of the caves where the aboriginal king of Anaga resided was in the San Andrés Valley. At the time of the conquest, this mencey was Beneharo. In a cave on the outskirts of this locality was discovered the famous Mummy of San Andrés, a mummified body belonging to the guanche culture. It is now held in the Museum of the Nature and the Man in the city of Santa Cruz de Tenerife.

In 1498, the Castilian Lope de Salazar received these lands after the conquest. From 1505–1510 Don Lope, built the chapel, on which the current church is based, and he placed two images: St. Andrew the Apostle, by special devotion, and Saint Lucy, in honor of the name of his wife. St. Andrew Church (Iglesia de San Andrés) was constructed on a structure from an earlier period. Also in San Andrés is the Castle of San Andrés, which was built to defend Tenerife of the assaults of the pirates.

A fortress used to exist, with a tower built in 1706, but was destroyed by storms in 1740 and 1896. Until the construction of the defensive castle, the village had acquired the reputation of a "pirate port" because the place was used as a landing stage for the numerous robber ships that frequented the waters of the Canary Islands at this time.

In 1797 San Andrés will participate in the defense of the island in front of the attack of Admiral Horatio Nelson, by sending militiamen of the village to the port of Santa Cruz and by avoiding with its castle the assault of the English on this part of the coast.

During the 19th century, the village was an independent municipality until 1850, when it was definitively annexed to Santa Cruz de Tenerife.

The village maintains the traditional lifestyle throughout the first half of the twentieth century. During the Civil War and the postwar period, San Andrés lives moments of hard repression and becomes in place of adjustment of the contrary to the Franco regime.

In 1973 the administration brought 4 million bags of Sahara sand to the island into the Las Teresitas beach and improved the infrastructure. The Spanish court stopped larger tourist properties in 1984. Since the 60s of the twentieth century, but especially in the 2000s, it has been attempted to transform the village into a large tourist center related to Las Teresitas beach.

Places of interest 
 The Castle of San Andrés
 Church of St. Andrew the Apostle
 The Beach of Las Teresitas
 San Andrés's Maritime Avenue
 The fishing dock
 The building of the town hall
 The Avenue Pedro Schwartz (known as The Wall)
 The cemetery (one of the most ancient of the island)
 The multicolor bridge (it crossing the ravine at its mouth)

Economy 
Residents of San Andrés live primarily on fishing. Tourism is also an important source of employment.

Environment 
Not far from  San Andrés is the beach named Playa de las Gaviotas, a  white volcanic sand beach by Igueste de San Andrés.

In nearby Macizo de Anaga one finds the zone of "El Bailadero", so named because, according to the old legends, it was the place where witches danced around bonfires and practiced witchcraft.

References

External links 

 San Andrés, Website

Santa Cruz de Tenerife